Luck Luck Ki Baat is an Indian  Television film  on Disney Channel India. It is a remake of the Disney Channel original movie The Luck of the Irish.

Plot
The movie centers on a 16-year-old Amit who is a class hero and an incredibly lucky student who attributes all his luck to his special gold coin. In a bid to find out about his heritage, he visits a local fair styled around Arabian Nights where the mystery deepens as he encounters a series of mystical and sinister characters; amidst colourful stalls, Arabian dancers and magical tricks. By the next day his luck starts to wear thin as he enters the unknown yet familiar world of magic.

Cast
 Satyajeet Dubey as Amit Kumar 
 Mahesh Thakur as Kishore Kumar
 Vandana Sajnani as Leena Kumar
 Lilliput as  Abul Jan
 Damandeep Singh Baggan as Ifrit Bula Bin Abdulla
 Kishan Savjani as Manpreet 
 Ayesha as Kainaaz
 Maninee De as Mrs. Mukherjee
 Shubh as Shubham Mishra

See also
 List of Disney Channel India Movies
 List of Disney television films
 List of Disney Channel (India) series

References

Indian remakes of American films
Disney television films
Comedy television films
Indian television films
Disney India films
Genies in film
Indian fantasy films
2012 fantasy films
2012 films